The 2005–06 season of Huddersfield Town A.F.C. was their second competitive campaign in the restructured Football League One. They finished in 4th place, qualifying them for the play-offs, but, after beating Barnsley 1–0 in the first leg at Oakwell, they lost the second leg 3–1 at the Galpharm Stadium, to lose 3–2 on aggregate.

Their season was also noted for their cup campaigns in the Football League Cup and FA Cup. They managed a respectable 3–1 loss to Blackburn Rovers at Ewood Park, where around half of the 12,000 crowd were Town fans. Then in the FA Cup, the Terriers were 8 minutes away from forcing a replay against José Mourinho's Chelsea, before succumbing to a goal by Eiður Guðjohnsen.

Squad at the start of the season

Review

Before the start of the season 2005–06, the club launched the controversial 'Young Guns' campaign. The players, manager Peter Jackson, assistant manager Terry Yorath, and coach Martyn Booty posed for the 2006 calendar in cowboy outfits. Six of the younger players featured on the cover of the corporate hospitality brochure. Basing the cover around the 'Young Guns' theme was widely considered to be a mistake and caused the booklet to be adversely linked with the Brokeback Mountain film.

Despite losing to Nottingham Forest on the opening day of the season, Huddersfield started the 2005–06 season brightly and were top of the table by mid-October. During the season they got the chance to show their pedigree by playing at Blackburn Rovers in the League Cup, which they lost 3–1.

Then they had a big money-spinning FA Cup match at Chelsea in January. They showed superb spirit to only lose 2–1, but many predicted it could be the turning point in Town's season, as they hadn't won a game since being drawn against them, a month earlier.

Gerry Murphy won the Football League's Contribution to Football award on 5 March 2006 selected by listeners of BBC Radio Five Live's Sport on Five.

With the season heading towards its climax, Town had to prepare for the play-offs after a disappointing April, which saw them lose out on automatic promotion to the Championship. The goals of Paweł Abbott, Gary Taylor-Fletcher, Andy Booth, Danny Schofield and Sheffield Wednesday loan signing David Graham helped Town to have the joint-second best scoring record in the division behind Swansea City.

Huddersfield beat Barnsley 1–0 at Barnsley in the play-off semi-final first leg but lost 1–3 (2–3 on aggregate) in the return.  Season highlights included an away victory against local rivals Bradford City and a league double over fellow neighbours Oldham Athletic.

Squad at the end of the season

Results

Pre-season matches

Football League One

League One Play-Offs

FA Cup

League Cup

Football League Trophy

Appearances and goals

References

2005-06
2005–06 Football League One by team